Tetralonia is a genus of insects belonging to the family Apidae.

The genus has almost cosmopolitan distribution.

Species:
 Tetralonia albida (Lepeletier, 1841) 
 Tetralonia amoena Walker, 1871

References

Apidae
Hymenoptera genera